Bailly Larinette Tatah (born 8 August 1995), professionally known as Blanche Bailly is a Cameroonian Afro pop singer and songwriter. Her debut official single ‘Kam we stay’ released in August 2016 saw her welcome into the music scene and since then, it has been hits after hits for the singer today celebrated as one of Africa's best .

Background 
Born in Kumba in the South West Region of Cameroon into a religious family, Blanche attended primary school at Sacred Heart Kumba South-West region and later did part of her secondary education in Baptist Secondary School-Kang Barombi and Diligent Bilingual College- Kumba before she relocated with her Family to France at age 12 where she continued her studies. Her stay in France benefited the singer as she owes that to her very bilingual nature. 
While in France she decided to pursue her dream and goal of becoming a stage performer and a recording artist. Her bumpy ride saw rejections, difficulties etc. which pushed her to relocate to the UK.

Career 

While in the UK, she met a Cameroonian artist who hooked her up with her first studio session. Back then the artist went by stage name ‘Swagger Queen’. By 2015, she released her first single ‘Killa’ produced by Ayo Beats. She later got in contact with Cameroonian-based music producer Mr. Elad who wrote her first official single ‘Kam we stay’ in 2016 produced by Cameroonian-based producer Philbillbeatz. After dropping the single, Blanche decided it was time to move back to her motherland and connect more with the industry she was trying to build a career from. 
With the success of ‘Kam we stay’, Blanche again in 2017 collaborated with Philbillbeatz on another single she wrote titled ‘Mimbayeur’ which features rapper Minks.  With more success on the single which blew up YouTube with over 5million views, Blanche Bailly became a house hold name in the Central African Music scene. She later dropped more hits like; ‘Dinguo, Bonbon and most recently ‘Ndolo’ and ‘Ton pied, mon pied’ and her latest Hit ‘Argent’. 
Blanche has performed in sold-out shows within Cameroon and countries like Gabon, Malabo, France, Geneva and in 2018 did a successful Europe club tour. 
Blanche Bailly's talent and hard work has been rewarded with nominations for Best Female Central African Artist at the AFRIMA, Best Urban and Revelation of the year at Canal D’or and winning Revelation of the year at Balafon Music Awards in 2016.

Humanitarian work 
In October 2018, Blanche Bailly joined artist like; Mr. Leo, Daphné, Minks, Pit Barccardi, Magasco and a host of others in a peace song; We Need Peace by Salatiel for the ongoing crisis in the Anglophone Regions of Cameroon.

Award & Nominations

See also 

 List of Cameroonian Actors
 Cinema of Cameroon

References

External links

Living people
Cameroonian film directors
Cameroonian actresses
1995 births